Christian Church refers to what different Christian denominations conceive of as being the true body of Christians or the original institution established by Jesus.

Christian Church may also refer to:

 Individual denominations within Christianity, which are also sometimes called Christian churches
 Individual buildings which are used as places of worship in Christianity

Individual denominations by name
 Christian Church (Disciples of Christ), a contemporary confederation of congregations in the Restoration Movement
 Christian Church (Disciples of Christ) in Canada, a mainline Protestant denomination with roots in Scottish Baptist immigration in the 19th century, 
 Christian Church in Luwuk Banggai, a Reformed denomination in Indonesia, a member of the World Communion of Reformed Churches
 Christian Church of Southern Sumatra, a Protestant church in Indonesia, based on the southern part of the island of Sumatra
 Christian Church of Sumba, a Calvinist church in Indonesia, a member of World Communion of Reformed Churches
 Christian Churches and Churches of Christ, a collective of unaffiliated contemporary Restoration congregations
 Christian Churches Ireland, a Pentecostal denomination and a part of the World Assemblies of God Fellowship

Others containing the term
 Apostolic Christian Church (ACC), a worldwide Christian denomination in the Anabaptist tradition
 Christian Churches Together (CCT), an organization formed in 2007 to "broaden and expand fellowship, unity and witness among the diverse expressions of Christian traditions in the USA
 Christian Reformed Church in North America (CRCNA or CRC), a Protestant Christian denomination in the United States and Canada
 Jacobite Syrian Christian Church, also known as the Malankara Jacobite Syrian Orthodox Church or the Syriac Orthodox Church of India,[15][16][17] is an autonomous Oriental Orthodox Church based in the Indian state of Kerala, and is an integral branch of the Syriac Orthodox Church of Antioch
 Redeemed Christian Church of God (RCCG), a Pentecostal megachurch and denomination founded in Lagos, Nigeria
 Zion Christian Church (ZCC), also known as Boyne, the largest African initiated church operating across Southern Africa
Christian Church (Protestant ecclesiology): a Protestant concept referring to the church invisible comprising all Christians

Buildings
 Christian Church (Boise, Idaho), listed on the U.S. National Register of Historic Places (NRHP)
 Christian Church (East Delhi, New York), listed on the NRHP

See also
 Christ's Church (disambiguation)
 Church of Christ (disambiguation)
Church (disambiguation)
 Churches of Christ, a fellowship of Restoration congregations, distinguished in part by not using instrumental music in their services.

Ecclesiology
Christian denominations